Artūras Žulpa (born 10 June 1990) is a Lithuanian footballer who plays for FC Aktobe as a midfielder.

Career

Club
On 27 December 2014, Žulpa signed a three-year contract with FC Aktobe. Following the conclusion of the 2015 season, Žulpa was transfer listed by Aktobe.

Tobol
In January 2016, Žulpa signed for FC Tobol, signing a new one-year contract with Tobol on 17 January 2018, and another one-year contract on 18 January 2019. On 5 January 2020, Tobol announced the departure of Žulpa from the club.

Siena
Žulpa started the 2020–21 season with Italian Serie D fallen giants Siena, following the club's refoundation by an Armenian businessgroup. However, he was released in March 2021 after having played only once with the Tuscanians.

Aktobe
On 14 April 2021, FC Aktobe announced the return of Žulpa.

Career statistics

Club

International

Statistics accurate as of match played 14 October 2019

International goals
Scores and results list Lithuania's goal tally first.

References

1990 births
Living people
Lithuanian footballers
Lithuania under-21 international footballers
Lithuania international footballers
Lithuanian expatriate footballers
Kazakhstan Premier League players
FK Žalgiris players
FC Aktobe players
FC Tobol players
Expatriate footballers in Kazakhstan
Association football midfielders